Certified Anesthesia Technologist (Cer.A.T.T.) is a title granted to an individual that successfully meets the experience and examination requirements of the certification. The certification is regulated by the American Society of Anesthesia Technologists & Technicians (ASATT).

Requirements
Requirements to sit for the Certified Anesthesia Technologist (Cer.A.T.T.) examination:

Successful completion of a 2 or 4 year CAAHEP accredited / CoA-ATE approved program through (American Society of Anesthesia Technologist & Technicians) ASATT
Current Certified Anesthesia Technician (Cer.A.T.).
Re-certified every 2-year period, after the Cer.A.T.T. designation was granted.
30 CE's needed every 2 years to recertify 

Anesthesia
Professional titles and certifications